Euposauridae was a family of lizards from the  Jurassic of Europe.  They were small to medium-sized.

External links
Squamata: Overview at Paleos.com

Jurassic lizards
Prehistoric animals of Europe
Jurassic reptiles of Europe
Lizard families
Prehistoric reptile families
Late Jurassic first appearances
Late Jurassic extinctions